"Sun Goes Down" is a single by Nesian Mystik, released on 8 February 2010. It is the second single from 99 A.D., their fourth studio album. It peaked at number three on the New Zealand Singles Chart, and was certified gold in its seventh week on the chart. It has since been certified platinum.

The track has been a success on New Zealand radio, particularly on Urban Radio Stations nationwide. The track ascended to number one on 16 March 2010 and has remained the most played song on urban radio for ten consecutive weeks.

References

2010 singles
Nesian Mystik songs
2010 songs
Warner Music Group singles